Kshitee Jog (क्षिती जोग) (born 1 January 1983) is an Indian television actress known for her part as Saraswati (the eldest daughter) and one of the main characters on the Zee TV serial Ghar Ki Lakshmi Betiyann.

She played a role in Sony TV's Maan Rahe Tera Pitaah. She was also part of comedy sitcom Sarabhai vs Sarabhai until replaced by Shital Thakkar.

She also acted in TV series Navya which ended on 29 June 2012.

Family
She is the daughter of Marathi actor Anant Jog and Marathi actress Ujwala Jog. She married Marathi actor-director Hemant Dhome in 2012.

Filmography

Television

References

External links

Indian television actresses
Living people
Indian soap opera actresses
Actresses from Mumbai
21st-century Indian actresses
1983 births